Telugu Talli (IAST: Teluɡu Talli) is the female personification of Telugu people and their culture.

She holds the harvest in her left hand portraying that the Telugu land is always filled with greenery (prosperity and happiness). In the right hand, she holds the kalasam which signifies that she brings all good to the people's lives. The goddess is dressed in the traditional Telugu style. Since language is considered one of the most necessary skills to the mankind and our Telugu Talli has provided us with that, she is given utmost priority in our lives.

Maa Telugu Talliki (Telugu: మా తెలుగు తల్లికి) is the official song of the state Andhra Pradesh, India. It was written by Sankarambadi Sundaraachari for the Telugu film Deena Bandhu (1942) which starred V. Nagayya. The song gained popularity and was ultimately made the official song of Andhra Pradesh.

Maa Telugu Talliki is a composition in which the greatness of Telugu culture is depicted. For the various versions on the etymology of Telugu, see Telugu language. The image of the mother is used as a metaphor for all the prosperity and culture of the region. She is the one who has bestowed us with fertile lands; she is the one whose compassion protects the people; she is the one whose praise is sung time and time again. She is the embodiment of various aspects of cultural legacy like the beautiful architecture of Amaravati; the classical music immortalised by Tyagaraja; the lyrical beauties of Tikkana, who rendered the Mahabharata into Telugu; the physical bravery of Rani Rudrama Devi of the 13th century Kakatiya dynasty; the 'devotion to husband' of Mallamma; the sharp intelligence of Timmarusu, who was the Prime Minister of Krishna Deva Raya; or the fame of Krishna Deva Raya. She is our mother, and will forever reside in our hearts. It may be seen that while invoking the cultural legacy of the Telugus, the song covers all the three important regions: Rayalaseema, Coastal Andhra and Telangana.

Original song lyrics

Popular culture 

A remix of the original song was used in the 2010 film Leader, composed by Mickey J. Meyer.

See also
 Telangana Talli
 Tamil Thai
Siam Devadhiraj

References

Telugu people